Paul McConkey (1956 – 16 December 1986) was a British slalom canoeist who competed in the 1980s. He was born in Bilston, Staffordshire.

He won a gold medal in the K-1 team event at the 1983 ICF Canoe Slalom World Championships in Meran.

McConkey was killed in a crash near Stafford, aged 30.

References

Overview of athlete's results at canoeslalom.net

British male canoeists
1956 births
1986 deaths
Medalists at the ICF Canoe Slalom World Championships